The Moog model 2090 Micromoog is a monophonic analog synthesizer produced by Moog Music from 1975 to 1979.

During 1973 and 1974, Moog attempted to produce a synth system, possibly as a result of seeing Yamaha's massive GX-1. The bass and polyphonic components of the "Constellation" became the Taurus and Polymoog, respectively, and while the Lyra monophonic lead synth never went into production, the smaller MicroMoog emerged, using some of the ideas and technology.

The monophonic Micromoog was designed by Moog Engineer Jim Scott in consultation with Tom Rhea, with electronic refinement input from David Luce, Robert Moog, as a scaled-down, cheaper alternative ($650–$800 market price) to the Minimoog. It was designed to tap into a market of musicians who wanted an introduction to synthesis, but who could not afford the $1,500 Minimoog. However, while the basic architecture was a simple VCO/VCF/VCA, inexpensive enhancements made it a more creative synth. Its single voltage-controlled oscillator has variable waveshape, which can also be modulated and a sub-octave can be added one or two octaves below. Its −24 dB per octave low-pass filter has its own envelope generator and can be frequency-modulated by the VCO. The voltage-controlled amplifier has its own envelope generator. A noise generator, sample and hold, low-frequency oscillator, and modulation routing complete the voicing. Moog chose to use two A(S)R envelope generators (with switchable sustain) instead of the single ADSR more commonly found on budget synths. Other switches like VCA bypass, VCF tone mode and release on/off allow quick changes to be made live.

It has a 32-note keyboard with a built-in ribbon controller instead of the more common pitch-bend wheel, although a retrofit pitch-bend wheel was available.

The Micromoog also features the Moog Open System control inputs, a pre-MIDI control system, which enables the unit to control or be controlled by other Moog synthesizers, even suggesting using it with Moog modules and sequencer. Unusually, the CV inputs were designed to operate at 0.95 V per octave the idea being that the 1 V/octave outputs of synths could get loaded down, but could still be used into the Micromoog. In practice, this is hard to achieve and cannot exceed 0.98 V per octave without modifications. Triggering is Moog standard S-triggering on Cinch Jones connectors. Modulation in/out is on a stereo 3/16" jack a difficult connector to find. An "access pwr" socket is provided for connection of Moog accessories such as the drum controller, sample and hold, and ribbon controller.

Early Micromoogs had slightly different panel labelling from serial number 1500 "Articulator" become "Loudness Contour". Later Micromoogs also gained an extra potentiometer on the back to adjust the keyboard output tracking. There were also internal changes to the keyboard.

The Micromoog has an audio input allowing external audio to be run through the filter and VCA.

The connections on the rear connection panel are as follows:

Outputs: LO Audio −10 dBm, HI Audio +12 dBm, S-trig, KBD, Access(ory) power ±15 VDC, 50 mA.

Inputs: filter, oscillator (0.95 volts per octave), S-trig, Audio Modulation

The Micromoog served as the basis for the Multimoog, a similarly styled, but more generously equipped synthesizer featuring two VCOs, a larger 44-note keyboard, greater modulation options and an early implementation of keyboard aftertouch functions.

Filter modification
The Micromoog has a "fault" that limits its bass timbre. The modification can be found here and has been said to make it able to compete with the Minimoog on a one oscillator level.

See also
Minimoog
Multimoog
Moog synthesizer
Polymoog
Robert Moog
Moog Music
List of Moog synthesizer players
Micromoog Original Manual
Gates and Triggers Explained
Micromoog at Synthmuseum.com
Micromoog at Vintage Synth Explorer
Wikipedia CV/Gate

Moog synthesizers
Analog synthesizers
Monophonic synthesizers